Triclista is a genus of flies in the family Tabanidae.

Species
Triclista guttata (Donovan, 1805)
Triclista media (Walker, 1848)
Triclista singularis (Macquart, 1846)

References

Tabanidae
Brachycera genera
Diptera of Australasia
Taxa named by Günther Enderlein